Waheed el Solh or Wahid Solh (in Arabic وحيد الصلح, born in Saida, Ottoman Empire 1901 – died in Beirut, 13 October 1958) was a Lebanese politician and a close aide to his uncle, former prime minister Sami Solh. At the time of his death, he was a Planning Ministry official.

Wahid Solh was born in 1901 in Saida, Lebanon. He was a relative of former Lebanese prime ministers Riad Solh, Sami Solh, Takieddine Solh and Rachid Solh. He was married to Mounira Solh, a pioneer advocate for the rights of women and people with disabilities in Lebanon. They had five children: Samir, Najla, Salim, Sana and Nassib.

He was assassinated for political reasons on October 13, 1958, during the civil war in Lebanon

References 

1901 births
1958 deaths
Assassinated Lebanese politicians
Al Solh family